The Surrogate is a 1984 Canadian erotic thriller film directed by Don Carmody and starring Art Hindle, Carole Laure, Shannon Tweed, and Jackie Burroughs. The film was written by Don Carmody and Robert Geoffrion, produced by Don Carmody and John Dunning, and executively produced by André Fleury and André Link. The film also features Jim Bailey, Michael Ironside, Marilyn Lightstone, Jonathan Welsh, Tony Scott, Mark Burns and Vlasta Vrána. The music was composed by Daniel Lanois, the cinematography was done by François Protat, and the editing was done by Rit Wallis.

The film was released 2 November 1984 through Metro-Goldwyn-Mayer (MGM).

Plot
A married couple, Frank and Lee, have problems with their sexual relationship. The psychotherapist recommends them to hire a mysterious woman who will give them new imaginations to restore their passion. Soon they find themselves drawn to a disastrous web of violence, insanity, and murder.

Cast
 Art Hindle as Frank Waite
 Carole Laure as Anouk Van Derlin
 Shannon Tweed as Lee Waite
 Jim Bailey as Eric
 Michael Ironside as George Kyber
 Marilyn Lightstone as Dr. Foreman
 Jackie Burroughs as Woman At Anouk's
 Barbara Law as Maggie Simpson
 Jonathan Welsh as Brenner
 Ron Lea as Salesman

References

Notes

External links

1984 films
English-language Canadian films
1980s erotic thriller films
Films produced by Don Carmody
Films produced by John Dunning
Canadian erotic thriller films
1980s English-language films
1980s Canadian films